Linden is a city in southern Genesee County, Michigan, United States. Its population was 4,142 at the 2020 census. It is part of the Flint metropolitan area.

History
Linden was settled in late 1835 by two brothers, Richard and Perry Lamb. Perry Lamb provided housing for travelers. The village of Linden subdivision was platted by Consider Warner and Eben Harris in 1840. Warner and Harris also built the Springer's Hotel hostelry that same year.

On September 23, 1851, the Linden post office was opened. North Linden village was platted in the northwest corner of section 20 along the railroad on January 31, 1857. Linden was incorporated as a village in 1871 by an act of the Legislature.

In 1974, the community began to hold its Summer Happening festival. In 1988, Linden changed its incorporated status from village to city.

In 2000, Linden, along with Fenton City and Township, passed a millage to turn the Tri-County Parks and Recreation share department into a parks and recreation metropolitan district, while Argentine Township and Tyrone Townships defeated the millage. Tri-County ceased operation on December 1, 2000 when the Southern Lakes Regional Parks and Recreation District began operations.

On May 18, 2007, a fire destroyed the historic Union Block of businesses and apartments on Broad Street. The building was demolished in August 2007 to make way for future development. In 2008, the LaFontaine family purchased the vacant space of seven lots. In 2014, an underground gasoline leak from the Beacon and Bridge gas station affected Union Block and other downtown properties. Dr. Nicole Wax of Wax Orthodontics of Linden purchased the block from the LaFontaine family in March 2016.

Summer Happenings was not held in 2011. A competing annual festival, Linden Mills Days, was launched in 2011 when Happenings pulled out of the city. In 2012, Happenings was held on Linden Community Schools grounds; while successful, it could not logistically return in 2013.

In September 2011, one of the Loose Senior Center buildings was destroyed by fire. A capital campaign began to replace the building. In June 2012, the center's board of directors agreed to place a bid on a building to move to in Fenton Township. Instead, the center added an expansion to an existing building which was finished in December 2013.

Geography
Linden is a lowland area typical of southern Michigan consisting of marsh, swamplands, previously dredged marl bottom lakes and surrounded by the similar geographic area of Fenton Township.

Demographics

As of 2000, the median income for a household in the city was $50,932, and the median income for a family was $57,798. Males had a median income of $50,000 versus $29,758 for females. The per capita income for the city was $23,620.  About 2.5% of families and 4.6% of the population were below the poverty line, including 3.2% of those under age 18 and 4.9% of those age 65 or over.

2010 census
As of the census of 2010, 3,991 people, 1,552 households, and 1,067 families were residing in the city. The 1,695 housing units averaged . The racial makeup of the city was 93.8% White, 3.5% African American, 0.5% Native American, 0.4% Asian, 0.6% from other races, and 1.3% from two or more races. Hispanics or Latinos of any race were 2.0% of the population.

Of 1,552 households,  33.4% had children under the age of 18 living with them, 55.9% were married couples living together, 9.3% had a female householder with no husband present, 3.6% had a male householder with no wife present, and 31.3% were not families. About 26.6% of all households were made up of individuals, and 13.9% had someone living alone who was 65 years of age or older. The average household size was 2.51 and the average family size was 3.04.

The median age in the city was 39.5 years. About 25.6% of residents were under the age of 18; 5.4% were 18 and 24; 25.9% were from 25 to 44; 23% were from 45 to 64, and 19.9% were 65 or older. The gender makeup of the city was 47.0% male and 53.0% female.

Government
Linden has a council-manager government and a Downtown Development Authority. The municipality operates its own water system (wells).

The  Loose Senior Citizen Center, which provides senior services and activities, is operated by a nonprofit. The center receives some funding from a Genesee County senior millage and from Southern Lakes Parks and Recreation. The 
Southern Lakes Regional Parks and Recreation District operates Linden's parks and recreation programs for Linden's residents.

References

External links
 City of Linden

Cities in Genesee County, Michigan
Populated places established in 1840